Artesa may refer to

Populated places
 Artesa, Arizona, a populated place in Pima County, Arizona, United States
 Artesa de Lleida, in the comarca of Segrià, Catalonia, Spain
 Artesa de Segre, in the comarca of Noguera, Catalonia, Spain

Others
 The Spanish word for a bread trough